Nile is a census-designated place and unincorporated community in Yakima County, Washington, United States, located approximately 35 miles northwest of Yakima in the Nile Valley adjacent to the Naches River in the Nile Valley, near the mouth of Rattlesnake Creek.

The community was established in the mid-1890s by families of  James Beck, William Markel and Henry Sedge, who may have named the small valley and community Nile because of the area's fertility thought to resemble that of the Nile River Valley in Egypt. According to historian Gretta Gossett, "there is yet an alluvial plain along the river near Nile Creek which is often flooded in the spring and left with a layer of silt perhaps giving rise to the name for the Nile in Egypt."

References

Unincorporated communities in Washington (state)
Unincorporated communities in Yakima County, Washington
Census-designated places in Washington (state)
Census-designated places in Yakima County, Washington